Chris Ray Wilcox (born September 3, 1982) is an American former professional basketball player. He has also played in the NBA with the Los Angeles Clippers, Seattle SuperSonics/Oklahoma City Thunder, New York Knicks and Detroit Pistons.

High School and College career
While at Whiteville High School in Whiteville, North Carolina, he led the basketball team to the 2A State Championship in 1999, before transferring to William G. Enloe High School in Raleigh, NC for his senior year. He then attended the University of Maryland, where he helped the Terrapins win their first NCAA championship in 2002.

Professional career

Los Angeles Clippers (2002–2006) 
Wilcox was drafted by the Los Angeles Clippers in 2002.

Seattle SuperSonics / Oklahoma City Thunder (2006–2009) 
Wilcox was traded on February 14, 2006, to the Seattle SuperSonics in exchange for Vladimir Radmanović.

While playing for the Sonics in 2005–2006, Wilcox averaged 14.1 points per game and 8.2 rebounds per game. He was on the starting lineup for 23 of his 29 games with the Sonics that season.

On April 4, 2006, Wilcox recorded a career-high 24 rebounds in a win over the Houston Rockets. Wilcox's rebound total was the most by a Sonic player since Jack Sikma grabbed 25 at Utah on February 10, 1983.

New York Knicks (2009) 
On February 19, 2009, Wilcox was traded to the New York Knicks for Malik Rose.

Detroit Pistons (2009–2011) 
On July 22, 2009, Wilcox signed a multi-year contract with the Detroit Pistons.

Boston Celtics (2011–2013) 
On December 9, 2011, Wilcox agreed to a contract with the Boston Celtics for the midlevel exception ($3 million). After being diagnosed with a heart irregularity, he was waived by the Celtics on March 23, 2012. However, Wilcox was later cleared to play, and he re-signed with the Celtics on July 14, 2012.

Wilcox's final NBA game was Game 4 of the 2013 Eastern Conference First Round against the New York Knicks on April 28th, 2013. Boston would win Game 4 97 - 90, but go on to lose the series in 6 games. In his final game, Wilcox only played for 43 seconds (substituting at the end of the 3rd quarter for Kevin Garnett) and recorded no stats.

NBA career statistics

Regular season

|-
| align="left" | 
| align="left" | L.A. Clippers
| 46 || 3 || 10.4 || .521 || .000 || .500 || 2.3 || .5 || .2 || .3 || 3.7
|-
| align="left" | 
| align="left" | L.A. Clippers
| 65 || 17 || 20.6 || .521 || .000 || .700 || 4.7 || .8 || .4 || .3 || 8.6
|-
| align="left" | 
| align="left" | L.A. Clippers
| 54 || 25 || 18.6 || .514 || .000 || .611 || 4.2 || .7 || .5 || .4 || 7.9
|-
| align="left" | 
| align="left" | L.A. Clippers
| 48 || 1 || 13.7 || .536 || .000 || .644 || 3.6 || .4 || .3 || .4 || 4.5
|-
| align="left" | 
| align="left" | Seattle
| 29 || 23 || 30.1 || .592 || .000 || .787 || 8.2 || 1.2 || .6 || .4 || 14.1
|-
| align="left" | 
| align="left" | Seattle
| 82 || 81 || 31.5 || .529 || .000 || .684 || 7.7 || 1.0 || .9 || .5 || 13.5
|-
| align="left" | 
| align="left" | Seattle
| 62 || 55 || 28.0 || .524 || .000 || .645 || 7.0 || 1.2 || .7 || .6 || 13.4
|-
| align="left" | 
| align="left" | Oklahoma City
| 37 || 6 || 19.4 || .485 || .000 || .598 || 5.3 || .9 || .5 || .3 || 8.4
|-
| align="left" | 
| align="left" | New York
| 25 || 0 || 13.2 || .529 || .000 || .509 || 3.3 || .6 || .3 || .2 || 5.4
|-
| align="left" | 
| align="left" | Detroit
| 34 || 10 || 13.0 || .525 || .000 || .500 || 3.4 || .4 || .4 || .4 || 4.5
|-
| align="left" | 
| align="left" | Detroit
| 57 || 29 || 17.5 || .581 || .000 || .562 || 4.8 || .8 || .5 || .3 || 7.4
|-
| align="left" | 
| align="left" | Boston
| 28 || 4 || 17.2 || .598 || .000 || .615 || 4.4 || .4 || .4 || .3 || 5.4
|-
| align="left" | 
| align="left" | Boston
| 61 || 7 || 13.6 || .719 || .000 || .672 || 3.0 || .4 || .5 || .5 || 4.2
|-
| align="left" | Career
| align="left" |
| 628 || 261 || 19.9 || .541 || .000 || .643 || 4.9 || .7 || .5 || .4 || 8.2

Playoffs

|-
| align="left" | 2013
| align="left" | Boston
| 2 || 0 || 3.0 || .000 || .000 || .000 || 1.0 || .0 || .0 || .0 || .0
|-
| align="left" | Career
| align="left" |
| 2 || 0 || 3.0 || .000 || .000 || .000 || 1.0 || .0 || .0 || .0 || .0

References

External links
Official Facebook Page
Official Twitter Page
Official Chris Wilcox Website
NBA Profile

1982 births
Living people
American men's basketball players
Basketball players from Raleigh, North Carolina
Boston Celtics players
Centers (basketball)
Detroit Pistons players
Los Angeles Clippers draft picks
Los Angeles Clippers players
Maryland Terrapins men's basketball players
New York Knicks players
Oklahoma City Thunder players
Power forwards (basketball)
Seattle SuperSonics players
William G. Enloe High School alumni